Most commonly refers to the National Rifle Association of America.

National Rifle Association may also refer to:
 Dominion of Canada Rifle Association
 Guyana National Rifle Association
 Grenada Gun and Rifle Association
 Jamaica Rifle Association
 National Rifle Association of Australia
 National Rifle Association of India
 National Rifle Association of Japan
 National Rifle Association of New Zealand
 National Rifle Association of Norway
 National Rifle Association of Pakistan
 National Rifle Association of Sri Lanka
 National Rifle Association (of the United Kingdom)
 Puerto Rico Handgun and Rifle Association
 South African Air Rifle Associations
 Trinidad Rifle Association

See also
 NRA (disambiguation)